Cosine error occurs in measuring instrument readings when the user of an instrument does not realize that the vector that an instrument is measuring does not coincide with the vector that the user wishes to measure. Often the lack of coincidence is subtle (with vectors almost coinciding), which is why the user does not notice it (or notices but fails to appreciate its importance). A simple example is taking a measurement across a rectangle but failing to realize that the line of measurement is not quite parallel with the edges, being slightly diagonal. Rather than measuring the desired vector (in this case, orthogonal width), the instrument is measuring the hypotenuse of a triangle in which the desired vector is in fact one of the legs. The cosine of this triangle correlates to how much error exists in the measurement (hence the name cosine error). Thus the user might measure a block of metal and come away with a width of 208.92 mm when the true width is 208.91 mm, a difference that matters to the subsequent machining. Although many workers might not use the term "cosine error" to name this mistake (instead calling it "failing to measure squarely"), the underlying concept is the same. For example, a novice at carpentry might make this kind of mistake with a tape measure that is slightly askew, whereas a master carpenter would know by ingrained experience to measure squarely. 

A context in which potential cosine error must often be considered is in the use of an indicator (distance amplifying instrument). 

Cosine error can also affect laser interferometry. 

Another context in which potential cosine error draws attention is in lidar traffic enforcement and radar traffic enforcement, where drivers assert that the speed measurement was in error because the lidar or radar signal was emitted in a direction not directly along the line of travel. (Cosine error always reduces the measured speed, thus favoring the motorist.) The extent to which it is true that the equipment is prone to this error, has been argued in traffic courts. It is demonstrably true that missile-guiding radars are capable of accurately measuring the oblique movements of enemy aircraft under a variety of conditions, but to what degree traffic enforcement radar or lidar succeeds at this problem has been challenged by defendants, who speak of the cosine effect or cosine error effect.

Mitigation 
The longer the length of the instrument, the easier it is to control cosine error. If the instrument is very small, then optical alignment techniques can be used to reduce cosine error.

References 

Error detection and correction